The 2016 Survivor Series was  the 30th annual Survivor Series professional wrestling pay-per-view and livestreaming event produced by WWE. It was held for wrestlers from the promotion's Raw and SmackDown brand divisions. The event took place on November 20, 2016, at the Air Canada Centre in Toronto, Ontario, Canada. It was the first to be four hours in length. It was also the first Survivor Series held following the reintroduction of the brand split. This was second Survivor Series to take place in Canada since 1997.

Eight matches were contested at the event, including two on the Kickoff pre-show. The main event featured the in-ring return of Goldberg (his last match was in March 2004 at WrestleMania XX), where he defeated Brock Lesnar in 1 minute and 26 seconds. The other five matches on the main card were interbrand matches, featuring wrestlers from the Raw brand against wrestlers from the SmackDown brand. Three of those matches were Survivor Series elimination matches; Raw's women and tag teams defeated SmackDown's while SmackDown's men defeated Raw in the penultimate match. In other prominent matches, SmackDown's Intercontinental Champion The Miz and Raw's WWE Cruiserweight Champion The Brian Kendrick retained their titles against challengers from the opposing brand, Raw's Sami Zayn and SmackDown's Kalisto, respectively; Had Kalisto won the Cruiserweight Championship, the entire cruiserweight division would have been transferred to SmackDown. The 2016 event also had both the longest and the (tied) shortest matches in the event's history.

Production

Background 
Survivor Series is an annual gimmick pay-per-view (PPV) and WWE Network event, produced every November by WWE since 1987. The second longest running pay-per-view event in history (behind WWE's WrestleMania), it is one of the promotion's original four pay-per-views, along with WrestleMania, Royal Rumble, and SummerSlam, referred to as the "Big Four". The event is traditionally characterized by having Survivor Series matches, which are tag team elimination matches that typically pits teams of four or five wrestlers against each other. In July, WWE reintroduced the brand extension, again splitting the roster between the Raw and SmackDown brands where wrestlers were exclusively assigned to perform. Subsequently, the 2016 event, which was the 30th event in the Survivor Series chronology, featured several interpromotional matches to determine which was the better brand, similar to WWE's previous Bragging Rights pay-per-view. The event was scheduled to be held on November 20, 2016, at the Air Canada Centre in Toronto, Ontario, Canada and was the first Survivor Series event to take place in Canada since 1997, which was known for the infamous "Montreal Screwjob" incident. WWE also expanded the event's length to four hours, marking the first Survivor Series held for this length, which was previously reserved for WrestleMania.

On the October 11 episode of SmackDown Live, SmackDown's Commissioner Shane McMahon and General Manager Daniel Bryan challenged Raw to three traditional Survivor Series elimination matches, involving each brand's best five male wrestlers, best five female wrestlers, and best five tag teams, respectively—with the latter having a total of 10 wrestlers per team, but with the stipulation being that if one member of a tag team was eliminated, both members of that particular tag team were eliminated (this was the first Survivor Series since the 1988 event to have teams of five tag teams going against each other). The following week on Monday Night Raw, Raw Commissioner Stephanie McMahon accepted the challenge to determine the better brand; this would be the genesis for the theme of the following years' events.

Storylines 

The card included eight matches, including two on the Kickoff pre-show. The matches resulted from scripted storylines, where wrestlers portrayed heroes, villains, or less distinguishable characters in scripted events that built tension and culminated in a wrestling match or series of matches, with results predetermined by WWE's writers on the Raw and SmackDown brands. Storylines were produced on WWE's weekly television shows, Monday Night Raw and SmackDown Live.

Over the following weeks, several tag teams were scheduled for the tag team elimination match. For Team SmackDown, Heath Slater and Rhyno were made captain by virtue of being SmackDown Tag Team Champions on the October 25 episode of SmackDown. They then successfully defended their titles (and their spot at Survivor Series) against The Spirit Squad in an impromptu match. The same night, The Hype Bros qualified for the team by defeating The Ascension. American Alpha and The Usos both qualified on the November 1 episode by defeating The Spirit Squad and The Headbangers, respectively. On the November 8 episode, Breezango defeated The Vaudevillains to qualify as the final tag team for Team SmackDown. On the final SmackDown before Survivor Series, Booker T in his King Booker character gave a motivational speech to the team. For Team Raw, Raw Tag Team Champions The New Day (Big E, Kofi Kingston, and Xavier Woods) were revealed as captains on the October 31 episode of Raw. The remaining four spots were filled the following week: Cesaro and Sheamus, Luke Gallows and Karl Anderson, Enzo Amore and Big Cass, and The Golden Truth (Goldust and  R-Truth). The New Day addressed the teams and then Gallows and Anderson, who were at odds with the rest of Team Raw, defeated Big E and Kingston in a non-title match. Also, R-Truth sold his team's spot to The Shining Stars for a timeshare. The Golden Truth then fought The Shining Stars in a losing effort to get their spot back.

The spots for the women's elimination match were also successively filled. On the October 25 episode of SmackDown, Nikki Bella became captain of Team SmackDown by defeating Natalya, who had demanded that position for herself. On the November 1 episode, SmackDown Women's Champion Becky Lynch, the number one contender Alexa Bliss, Carmella, and Naomi were revealed as the remaining team members, with Natalya introduced as the team's coach. On the November 8 episode, the team's unity was strained when Carmella confronted Bella. Natalya, who was involved in a match against Naomi, tried to separate the two, which cost her the match. The same night, Lynch successfully defended her championship against Bliss, albeit in controversial fashion. For Team Raw, Raw Women's Champion Charlotte Flair (as team captain), Bayley, and Nia Jax were revealed as team members on the October 31 episode of Raw. On the November 7 episode, Alicia Fox and Sasha Banks were introduced as the final members. Earlier, Charlotte had falsely advertised her protégé Dana Brooke as the fifth member, only to be corrected by Michael Cole. Banks, Bayley, and Fox then defeated Charlotte, Jax, and Brooke in a six-woman tag team match when Bayley pinned Charlotte. On the November 14 episode, due to differences between team members, Charlotte and Banks teamed up and defeated Fox and Jax. On the final SmackDown before Survivor Series, Charlotte came down to ringside during a match between Bella and Carmella. Bella then attacked Charlotte, which prompted the rest of Team Raw to attack Bella. Carmella and the rest of Team SmackDown then came to Bella's aid. The two teams brawled with Team SmackDown getting the upper hand.

The teams for the men's elimination match began to take shape on the October 31 episode of Raw, when after weeks of lobbying for the position, WWE Universal Champion Kevin Owens and Chris Jericho were made co-captains of Team Raw. General Manager Mick Foley then also added United States Champion Roman Reigns. Braun Strowman qualified by winning a 12-man battle royal. On the November 7 episode, Seth Rollins was revealed as the final member. To settle the team's differences, Stephanie McMahon put all five men in a fatal-five-way match, which culminated in Owens accidentally pinning Jericho. On the final Raw before Survivor Series, Stephanie tested the team's unity by having the team of Owens and Reigns and the team of Jericho, Rollins, and Strowman face Cesaro and Sheamus and The New Day, respectively, which both teams won. For Team SmackDown, Daniel Bryan introduced all members on the November 1 episode of SmackDown: WWE World Champion AJ Styles (as captain), Dean Ambrose, Randy Orton, Bray Wyatt, and Baron Corbin. A week later, Shane McMahon made James Ellsworth the team's mascot. To settle some of the team's differences, Shane also scheduled a six-man tag match pitting The New Wyatt Family (Bray, Orton, and Luke Harper) against Ambrose, Ellsworth, and Corbin. When Corbin refused to take part in the match, he was replaced by Kane, and Corbin instead wrestled Kalisto; during the match, he was kayfabe injured, rendering him unable to compete at Survivor Series. After the Wyatts defeated Ambrose, Ellsworth, and Kane, Daniel Bryan named Shane McMahon as Corbin's replacement at Survivor Series. On the November 7 episode of Raw, Stephanie invited both Shane and Bryan to appear on the following week's Raw to address the interpromotional matches, which Shane and Bryan accepted. During this meeting, each commissioner and general manager touted the reasons for why their respective brand was better and eventually called out their respective male teams. In the ensuing battle, Roman Reigns and Seth Rollins of Team Raw stood tall at the end. On the final SmackDown before Survivor Series, SmackDown's male team were the guests on Edge's Cutting Edge show to address the match and their team unity. The Undertaker then came out and warned the team to win the match or face consequences.

At WrestleMania XX in 2004, Goldberg defeated Brock Lesnar. This was their only match against each other as both left WWE after the event; Lesnar returned to the WWE in 2012. Goldberg, who originally had no intention of ever returning to WWE, began a working relationship with the promotion again in January 2016, thanks to 2K Sports, who publishes the WWE 2K video games. On the May 30 episode of Raw, Goldberg was revealed as the pre-order bonus for the WWE 2K17 video game, which featured Lesnar on the cover. During the 2016 SummerSlam weekend at the WWE 2K event in Germany, Goldberg jokingly challenged Lesnar to a match. Lesnar and Goldberg continually traded barbs and insults against each other on social media and at WWE 2K17 press events. On October 5, Goldberg appeared on ESPN's SportsCenter with Jonathan Coachman to promote his appearance in WWE 2K17. He teased a possible return to WWE, and stated that he would want to face Lesnar if he were to return because he owed Lesnar a rematch. On the October 10 episode of Raw, Paul Heyman on behalf of Lesnar issued a challenge to Goldberg, stating that Goldberg was the one blemish on Lesnar's WWE career. On the October 17 episode, Goldberg accepted the challenge. The following week, the match was scheduled for Survivor Series. On the October 31 episode of Raw, Heyman interrupted Goldberg and teased that Lesnar was there to fight, but then Rusev came out to confront Goldberg. Goldberg attacked Rusev with a Jackhammer and Heyman with a Spear. On the November 7 episode, video packages were shown hyping the match, with the announcement that both Goldberg and Lesnar would come face-to-face the following week. On the final Raw before Survivor Series, both men addressed each other, albeit with security officers between them. Lesnar pushed some officers into Goldberg, and Goldberg cleared out the rest. Lesnar then retreated instead of staying to fight.

At No Mercy, Dolph Ziggler defeated The Miz in a career vs. title match for the Intercontinental Championship. Ziggler offered The Miz a rematch for the title, but The Miz refused. On the November 1 episode of SmackDown, after successfully defending the Intercontinental Championship against Curt Hawkins, Ziggler made an open challenge to any wrestler from the Raw brand to face him for the title at Survivor Series. On the November 7 episode of Raw, Sami Zayn revealed that Mick Foley wanted him to face Ziggler for the Intercontinental title, but Stephanie preferred Rusev and scheduled a match between the two, with the winner going on to face Ziggler. Zayn defeated Rusev, earning the title match. However, his opponent changed when The Miz regained the title from Ziggler, albeit with help from Maryse, on SmackDowns 900th episode on November 15.

On the November 8 episode of SmackDown, Bryan revealed that since SmackDown's Intercontinental Championship would be defended against a wrestler from Raw, Foley allowed Raw's WWE Cruiserweight Champion The Brian Kendrick to defend the title against a SmackDown wrestler. Bryan chose Kalisto and revealed that if Kalisto would win the title, the entire cruiserweight division would come to SmackDown. On the November 14 episode of Raw, Kendrick addressed the cruiserweights, and assured them that he would defeat Kalisto and keep the division on Raw. However, all were at odds with him and Sin Cara, Kalisto's former tag team partner, stated that Kalisto would be a better champion. Kendrick won an ensuing match against Sin Cara by submission.

Event

Pre-show 
During the Survivor Series Kickoff pre-show, T. J. Perkins, Rich Swann and Noam Dar defeated Tony Nese, Drew Gulak and Ariya Daivari when Swann executed a standing 450° splash on Daivari for a pinfall.

Later, Kane defeated Luke Harper after a chokeslam.

Preliminary matches 
The actual pay-per-view opened with the women's Survivor Series match pitting Team Raw (Charlotte, Bayley, Sasha Banks, Alicia Fox, and Nia Jax) against Team SmackDown (Nikki Bella, Carmella, Naomi, Alexa Bliss, and Becky Lynch) in a 5-on-5 Survivor Series Elimination Match. Immediately before the match, SmackDown's captain Nikki Bella was attacked backstage, leaving her unable to compete, and team coach Natalya replaced her. Fox pinned Carmella after a scissors kick but was herself pinned by Bliss after Twisted Bliss. Naomi was counted out after Jax attacked her. Natalya pinned Banks with a roll-up but was pinned by Charlotte after a Queen's Boot. Lynch forced Jax submit to the Dis-arm-her, eliminating Jax. Charlotte pinned Bliss with a Queen's Boot. Bayley pinned Lynch after a Bayley-to-Belly Suplex, leaving Bayley and Charlotte as the survivors for Team Raw. After the match, Charlotte attacked Bayley.

Next, The Miz defended the Intercontinental Championship against Sami Zayn. In the end, Zayn applied the Figure-four leglock on Miz; as Miz was about to submit, Miz's manager Maryse rang the ring bell. Zayn released the hold, thinking he had won, but Miz pinned him with a roll-up to retain the title.

After this, Team Raw (The New Day (Big E and Kofi Kingston), Cesaro and Sheamus, Enzo Amore and Big Cass, The Shining Stars, and Luke Gallows and Karl Anderson) faced Team SmackDown (Heath Slater and Rhyno, The Hype Bros, American Alpha, Breezango, and The Usos) in the tag team's Survivor Series match. Breezango, in their new fashion police attire, began by handing out tickets to everyone but were quickly eliminated by The New Day after the Midnight Hour (a Big Ending and diving DDT combination) on Fandango. Immediately after, Jimmy Uso executed a superkick on Kingston for a pinfall to eliminate New Day. Gallows and Anderson performed a Magic Killer on Zack Ryder, eliminating The Hype Bros. American Alpha executed an electric chair/diving bulldog combination on Primo, eliminating The Shining Stars. Gallows and Anderson eliminated American Alpha with a Magic Killer on Jason Jordan, but were eliminated by Rhyno and Heath Slater after Rhyno performed a Gore on Gallows. Enzo Amore and Big Cass then performed a Bada Boom Shakalaka on Rhyno, eliminating him and Heath Slater. The Usos eliminated Enzo and Cass after a Samoan Splash on Enzo. In the end, Cesaro applied the Sharpshooter on Jey Uso while Sheamus performed a Brogue Kick on Jimmy. Jey submitted, leaving Cesaro and Sheamus as the sole survivors for Team Raw.

In the fourth match, The Brian Kendrick defended the WWE Cruiserweight Championship against Kalisto. Kendrick won by disqualification after Baron Corbin attacked Kendrick and then Kalisto, meaning Kendrick retained the title and the cruiserweight division remained on Raw. Backstage, Daniel Bryan confronted Corbin, who explained that he acted out of revenge on Kalisto to prevent more cruiserweights from appearing on SmackDown.

The next match was the men's Survivor Series elimination match featuring Team Raw (Kevin Owens, Chris Jericho, Braun Strowman, Roman Reigns, and Seth Rollins) against Team SmackDown (AJ Styles, Dean Ambrose, Bray Wyatt, Randy Orton, and Shane McMahon), who were accompanied by their mascot, James Ellsworth. Early in the match, Ambrose and Styles got into a heated argument. Ambrose attacked Styles, but was surprised by Strowman, who scored a pinfall after a running powerslam; Styles did not attempt to break the pin. Afterwards outside the ring, Orton executed an RKO on Strowman onto a broadcast table. McMahon put Strowman through the table with a Leap of Faith. Strowman was counted out when Ellsworth, who hid under the ring, held Strowman's legs to prevent him from returning to the ring. Strowman then chased Ellsworth up the entrance ramp and threw him off the stage. Later, Styles attempted the Styles Clash on Jericho but Owens attacked Styles with the List of Jericho and was disqualified. Jericho was distraught by his list being ripped apart. This allowed Orton to pin him after an RKO. McMahon then attempted a Coast to Coast but Reigns caught him mid-air with a spear. The referee ruled the apparently unconscious Shane unfit to continue, eliminating him from the match. Ambrose, who had already been eliminated, returned to attack Styles and helped his former Shield brethren Rollins and Reigns perform a triple powerbomb on Styles through a broadcast table. Rollins rolled Styles back in the ring for the pinfall. As Rollins attempted a Frog Splash on Wyatt, Orton quickly performed an RKO on Rollins, allowing Wyatt to score a pinfall. Reigns, Team Raw's final member, attempted a spear on Wyatt, however, Reigns performed a spear on Orton instead, who had pushed Wyatt out of the way. Wyatt then performed Sister Abigail on Reigns for the pin, leaving Wyatt and Orton as the survivors for Team SmackDown.

Main event 
In the main event, Goldberg faced Brock Lesnar (accompanied by Paul Heyman). Lesnar tackled Goldberg into the corner, only for Goldberg to shove Lesnar to the mat. As Lesnar stood up, Goldberg performed a spear on Lesnar. Goldberg then executed another spear and a Jackhammer on Lesnar to win the match.

Aftermath

Raw 
On the following night's Raw, Goldberg celebrated his victory over Brock Lesnar and declared himself as the first entrant in the 2017 Royal Rumble match. The following week, Paul Heyman commented that he and Lesnar had been humiliated by Goldberg, whom they had underestimated, and that Lesnar would also compete in the Royal Rumble. Lesnar entered at number twenty-six and dispatched of several other wrestlers before Goldberg came out at number twenty-eight and once again humiliated Lesnar by quickly eliminating him from the match. They fought once more at WrestleMania 33, where Lesnar defeated Goldberg in a match for the Universal Championship to end the feud.

On the post-Survivor Series Raw, Sami Zayn was punished for failing to bring the Intercontinental Championship to his brand by being put into a match against Braun Strowman. Strowman brutalized Zayn until he was no longer able to compete and Mick Foley stopped the match, giving the win to Strowman.

After winning the elimination tag team match for Raw, Cesaro and Sheamus were granted a title shot for the Raw Tag Team Championship against The New Day the next night on Raw. However, The New Day retained their championship.

On the Highlight Reel during Raw, Chris Jericho got into a heated argument with his best friend Kevin Owens. Jericho blamed Owens for using "The List of Jericho" as a weapon, whereas Owens explained that he tried to save Jericho from being eliminated. The two finally agreed that Roman Reigns and Seth Rollins were at fault for Team Raw's loss. Rollins then demanded a title shot for Owens's WWE Universal Championship, as he was guaranteed a match for being part of Team Raw. Mick Foley then scheduled Owens to defend the title in the main event against Rollins in a no disqualification match, with Reigns and Jericho banned from ringside. The match ended when Jericho, disguised as a masked fan, interfered, allowing Owens to capitalize and retain the championship. The following week, the friendship between Owens and Jericho was strained further, when Owens stated he did not need Jericho's help against the challenge of Roman Reigns. Reigns then defeated Owens to earn a title match for the Universal Championship at Roadblock.

Also on Raw, Charlotte justified her attack on Bayley, stating she no longer had to be her teammate after the match. She was then confronted by Sasha Banks, who invoked her championship rematch clause. Charlotte agreed, but insisted that the match would take place the following week, in her own hometown. The next week, Banks defeated Charlotte in a falls-count-anywhere match for her third Raw Women's Championship. On the December 5 edition of Raw, Banks challenged Charlotte to an Iron Woman Match for the title at Roadblock: End of the Line, which was made official later that night.

Rich Swann defeated T. J. Perkins and Noam Dar in a triple threat match to become the number one contender for the Cruiserweight Championship. On the premiere of the cruiserweight's new exclusive show, 205 Live, Swann defeated Kendrick for the championship.

SmackDown  
The following SmackDown, Shane McMahon granted James Ellsworth a SmackDown contract for his dedication to the SmackDown brand. AJ Styles criticized this decision, arguing that Ellsworth should earn his contract in a ladder match. Ellsworth accepted the challenge, with both his new contract and a future opportunity at the WWE World Championship on the line. Dean Ambrose, who had been repeatedly sent out of the arena, returned during the match and helped Ellsworth defeat Styles.

The Miz confronted Daniel Bryan about retaining the Intercontinental Championship and gloated over Kalisto not winning his match. Bryan responded that the way Miz won his match humiliated SmackDown and then scheduled Miz to immediately defend the title against Kalisto. Miz won the match when Corbin distracted Kalisto. After the match, Corbin attacked Kalisto with the End of Days, while Miz's celebration was cut short by Dolph Ziggler with a Superkick. Bryan later scheduled The Miz to defend the Intercontinental Championship against Ziggler at TLC in a ladder match. As punishment for costing Kalisto two title opportunities and SmackDown the cruiserweight division, Bryan put Baron Corbin in a match against Kane. During the match, Kalisto attacked Corbin. Afterwards on Talking Smack, a chairs match between the two was scheduled for TLC.

The dissension between SmackDown's women continued backstage as Alexa Bliss demanded another match for the SmackDown Women's Championship, which Becky Lynch accepted for TLC. After Natalya blamed Becky for her team's loss at Survivor Series, Shane blamed the entire team, especially the absence of Nikki Bella, and scheduled a match between Natalya and Becky. Becky won the match but was attacked afterwards by Alexa. The following week, during the contract signing, Becky attacked Alexa but was eventually put through a table by Alexa. The match between the two was made a tables match. Also backstage, Nikki Bella accused Carmella of being the one that attacked her at Survivor Series, which Carmella denied. Nikki added that regardless of who attacked her, she would settle her differences with Carmella at TLC in a no disqualification match.

After winning the Survivor Series match for SmackDown's men's team, Bray Wyatt and Randy Orton challenged American Alpha, who had just become number one contenders for the SmackDown Tag Team Championship by defeating The Hype Bros, The Ascension, Breezango, The Usos, and The Vaudevillains in a Tag Team Turmoil, to put that spot on the line. The following week, Wyatt and Orton defeated American Alpha to become the number one contenders against Heath Slater and Rhyno at TLC.

Results 

Team SmackDown's captain, Nikki Bella, was attacked backstage before the match, rendering her unable to compete. The team's coach, Natalya, replaced her.

Survivor Series elimination matches

References

External links 
 

2016
2016 WWE Network events
2016 in Toronto
Professional wrestling in Toronto
Events in Toronto
2016 WWE pay-per-view events
November 2016 events in Canada
WWE in Canada